Andres Castor Centino (born February 4, 1967) is a Philippine Army general who has served as the chief of staff of the Armed Forces of the Philippines since 2023 and previously from 2021 to 2022. He previously served as the 64th commanding general of the Philippine Army in 2021 and commander of the 4th Infantry Division from 2020 to 2021.

Early life
Centino was born on February 4, 1967, in Tacloban, Leyte, and grew up in Cebu City, Cebu. He is the eldest of five children born to Araceli (née Castor) and Flaviano Centino. He attended the University of the Philippines High School Cebu. At the encouragement of his father, he entered the Philippine Military Academy in 1984 and graduated with honors as part of the Maringal Class of 1988, earning his commission as an Army second lieutenant.

Education 
Centino earned his Bachelor of Science, at the Philippine Military Academy (PMA), located in Baguio, Benguet in 1988. Centino also attended various courses throughout his career, such as the Basic Airborne Course, the First Scout Ranger Regiment Course, and the Command and General Staff Course at the Armed Forces of the Philippines Command and General Staff College in Camp Emilio Aguinaldo, Quezon City, where he finished the course as part of the top ten of his class. Centino also holds a Master of Business Administration, at University of the Philippines Cebu, in Cebu City, Cebu, and a Master of Science in National Resource Strategy at the National Defense University, in Washington, D.C., US.

Military career
After graduating in the PMA in 1988, Centino has undergone various military trainings in security and intelligence operations. Centino's career assignments includes the Secretary in the Army General Staff in Fort Andres Bonifacio and as Chief of Staff of the 4th Infantry "Diamond" Division. Centino before serving as commander of the 26th Infantry "Ever Onward" Battalion in 2008, before being named as commander of the 401st Infantry "Unity" Brigade in 2017. In 2019, Centino was named as the Deputy Chief of Staff for Operations, Organization, and Training, J3 at Camp Emilio Aguinaldo.

4th Infantry Division 
Centino assumed command of the 4th Infantry Division in Cagayan de Oro in May 2020.

Infantry operations against the New People's Army intensified within his area of command even amidst the effects COVID-19 pandemic in the Philippines. Centino also led the implementation of Executive Order No. 70, aimed at institutionalizing the whole-of-nation approach in attaining inclusive and sustainable peace and ending the local communist armed conflict in the Philippines.

During his tenure, the 4th Infantry Division was awarded as the "Fightingest Division" for their continuous offensive operations against the New People's Army, and was awarded the "Best Army Unit" in 2020.

Commanding General of the Philippine Army 
Centino was appointed the 64th Commanding General of the Philippine Army in May 2021.

His appointment came after the removal of then-acting Commanding General, Lieutenant General Jose Faustino Jr. after only serving for 87 days. Faustino's appointment drew criticisms from the Commission on Appointments due the general's ineligibility to the position even in an acting capacity under Section 4 of Republic Act No. 8186. During a senate confirmation hearing, Senator Panfilo Lacson read verbatim "no officer shall be assigned or designated to certain key positions including the Commanding General of the Philippine Army if he has less than one year of active service remaining prior to compulsory retirement at the age of 56."

Under his leadership, Centino vowed to continue the army's modernization, make efforts towards combating terrorism through peace program, and strengthen the army's response towards all threats. As Commanding General, he initiated reforms in strengthening meritocracy in the army and credential-based promotion, while promoting the recruitment of qualified applicants within the service and continuing the army's modernization program.

Chief of Staff of the Armed Forces of the Philippines 
Centino was appointed the 57th Chief of Staff of the Armed Forces of the Philippines by then President Rodrigo Duterte in November 2021, replacing General Jose Faustino Jr..  His tenure included the 2022 Philippine presidential election wherein the Armed Forces of the Philippines worked to ensure a peaceful and secure transition of power from the Duterte Administration to the Marcos Administration. He continued to serve as the chief of staff under President Bongbong Marcos until August 8, 2022, when he was succeeded by Lieutenant General Bartolome Vicente Bacarro.

Awards and decorations
General Centino has received the following awards:

Right Side

Personal life
Centino is married to Sheila Sucalit, and together have four children.

References

1967 births
Living people
People from Cebu
Philippine Military Academy alumni
Philippine Army generals
Chairmen of the Joint Chiefs (Philippines)
Bongbong Marcos administration personnel
Duterte administration personnel